Ian David Stark, OBE (born 22 February 1954) is a retired Scottish equestrian who competed in the sport of eventing.  Stark was born in Galashiels in the Borders in 1954 and began riding horses at the age of 10.

Stark was inducted into the Scottish Sports Hall of Fame in March 2010.

Career
In 1984 Stark won a silver medal for eventing in the Olympic Games, which were held in Los Angeles.  In 2000 Stark won a silver team medal for eventing in the Olympic Games held in Sydney, Australia.

Other accomplishments are:
Two silver medals in the Seoul Games of 1988
Two silver medals in the World Championships in 1990
Two gold medals in the European Eventing Championships in 1991
A gold in the European Eventing Championships in 1997
Winner of the Badminton Horse Trials in 1999

Stark retired from competition upon completing the 2007 Kentucky Three Day Event aboard Full Circle II.

Honours

Stark was awarded the MBE in 1989 and OBE in 2000.

References

External links
Ian Stark at the Gazetteer for Scotland

1954 births
Living people
British event riders
Scottish equestrians
Equestrians at the 1984 Summer Olympics
Equestrians at the 1988 Summer Olympics
Equestrians at the 1992 Summer Olympics
Equestrians at the 1996 Summer Olympics
Equestrians at the 2000 Summer Olympics
Officers of the Order of the British Empire
Olympic equestrians of Great Britain
British male equestrians
Olympic silver medallists for Great Britain
People from Galashiels
Olympic medalists in equestrian
Scottish Olympic medallists
Sportspeople from the Scottish Borders
Medalists at the 2000 Summer Olympics
Medalists at the 1988 Summer Olympics
Medalists at the 1984 Summer Olympics